Fashions for Women is a lost 1927 American drama silent film directed by Dorothy Arzner and written by Paul Armont, Jules Furthman, Percy Heath, Herman J. Mankiewicz, Léopold Marchand and George Marion, Jr. The film stars Esther Ralston, Raymond Hatton, Einar Hanson, Edward Martindel, William Orlamond and Agostino Borgato. The film was released on March 26, 1927, by Paramount Pictures.

Plot
A social comedy about a cigarette girl, Lulu, who falls in love with a count while finding success as a fashion model.

Cast 
Esther Ralston as Céleste de Givray and Lola Dauvry
Raymond Hatton as Sam Dupont
Einar Hanson as Raoul de Bercy
Edward Martindel as Duke of Arles
William Orlamond as Roue
Agostino Borgato as Monsieur Alard
Edward Faust as Monsieur Pettibon
Yvonne Howell as Mimi
Maude Wayne as The Girl
Charles Darvas as Restaurant Manager

References

External links 
 

1927 films
1920s English-language films
Silent American drama films
1927 drama films
Paramount Pictures films
Films directed by Dorothy Arzner
American black-and-white films
American silent feature films
Lost American films
1927 lost films
Lost drama films
1920s American films